Amity University, Noida (also known as Amity University Uttar Pradesh) is a private research university located in Noida, India. It was established in 2005 by an Act of the State Legislature of Uttar Pradesh. The university is recognized by University Grants Commission and accredited by the NAAC with grade 'A+'. Amity University offers programs on campus and through distance mode, in a number of fields of study at undergraduate, postgraduate, and doctoral levels. It has campuses in India and overseas branch campuses in London, Dubai, Singapore and New York.

History
Amity University was established on 24 March 2005 through The Amity University Uttar Pradesh Act, 2005 (Act 11 of 2005) of the UP Vidhan Sabha by the Ritnand Balved Education Foundation.

It was India's first private university to implement reservations and merit-based scholarships for students. In 2011, the school was reported to have over 80,000 students across 240 programs.

Ashok Chauhan is the president of the Ritnand Balved Education Foundation, Atul Chauhan the chancellor of Amity University and the vice chancellor is Dr. Balvinder Shukla. Aseem Chauhan is the additional president of the foundation.

In September 2015, the university signed a memorandum of understanding with the BSE Institute, a subsidiary of the Bombay Stock Exchange, to commence a 2-year distance learning MBA program in global financial markets, that will be open to students and working professionals.

In September 2016, the university inaugurated its New York campus by purchasing 170-acre campus of St. John's University in Oakdale, New York.

Academics

Rankings 

Internationally, Amity University, Noida was ranked 1001–1200 by The QS World University Rankings for 2023 and 200 in Asia. The Times Higher Education World University Rankings also ranked it 1001–1200 in the world for 2023. It also ranked the university 401–500 in Asia for 2022 and at the same band among emerging economies. The university was ranked 901–1000 in the Academic Ranking of World Universities of 2022.

In India, the National Institutional Ranking Framework (NIRF) ranked it 65 in the overall ranking for 2018, 58 among universities (2019), 25 in the pharmacy ranking and 48 in the management ranking.

Amity School of Engineering & Technology, Noida was ranked 32 in India by the NIRF engineering ranking for 2020. The university was ranked 236 in Times Higher Education Global Employability Ranking 2020.

Accreditation 
Amity University, Noida has been accredited by the National Accreditation and Assessment Council (NAAC) with grade 'A+'. The university has secured the IET’s international accreditation for six of its engineering programmes. Amity law programs are recognised by Bar Council of India. Distance mode programs of the university are recognized by the Distance Education Bureau. The management programs are accredited by the Accreditation Council for Business Schools and Programs (ACBSP). Amity University, Noida has also been accredited by the WASC Senior College and University Commission (WSCUC).

Notable alumni 

 Amisha Sethi, author
 Apar Gupta, advocate
 Himansh Kohli, actor
 Kunal Khemu, film actor
 Harshita Gaur, actress
 Kratika Sengar, TV actress
 Kulpreet Yadav, author
 Pankaj Singh, politician
 Rajisha Vijayan

References

External links

Private universities in Uttar Pradesh
Universities and colleges in Noida
Private universities in India
2005 establishments in Uttar Pradesh
Educational institutions established in 2005